This is a list of all episodes of The Addams Family original black-and-white television series, that ran from 1964 until 1966, on the American Broadcasting Company.

Series overview

Episodes
 (s) = Story
 (t) = Teleplay

Season 1 (1964–65)

Season 2 (1965–66)
In the second season, a fireman's pole appears in the living room and is used at various times by Uncle Fester, Grandmama and the children. Fester goes both up and down it as does Gomez.

Also in the second season, Gomez is shown more often standing on his head. Sometimes this was faked and he hung from a trapeze for long scenes, and at other times it is clever cuts using a stuntman. John Astin is vague about whether he can do it himself.

Special (1977)

Home releases
MGM Home Entertainment released The Addams Family on DVD in Region 1 in 2006 and 2007, in three volumes, and a complete set including all 64 episodes.

Notes

References

External links
 
 
 

Episodes
Lists of American sitcom episodes